Statistics of Football League First Division in the 1968-69 season.

Overview
Leeds United won the First Division title for the first time in the club's history that season. They wrapped up the title on 28 April 1969, with a 0–0 draw at title challengers Liverpool and finished the season unbeaten at home. Queens Park Rangers went down on 29 March, after losing 2–1 at home to Liverpool. Leicester City joined them after losing 3–2 at Manchester United, where a win would have saved Leicester from relegation at the expense of Coventry City.

League standings

Results

Managerial changes

Top scorers

References

RSSSF

Football League First Division seasons
Eng
1968–69 Football League
1968–69 in English football leagues

lt:Anglijos futbolo varžybos 1968–1969 m.
hu:1968–1969-es angol labdarúgó-bajnokság (első osztály)
ru:Футбольная лига Англии 1968-1969